Circle Commerce is an American order management software company located in Windsor, Connecticut, United States.

History
Circle Commerce was founded in 1991 under the name Avexxis Corporation by former consultants from a major accounting firm. In 2011, the company re-branded itself as Circle Commerce and in 2012, received financing the state of Connecticut’s Department of Economic and Community Development (DECD), who awarded the company a $250,000 loan and $100,000 grant as part of the state’s Business Express Program.

Circle Commerce has customers such as Vermont Teddy Bear, C.C. Filson, and Herrington Catalog.

Products
Circle Commerce's flagship product is Circle Commerce Manager, a complete order management software system. It contains modules such as sales (order entry), products, marketing, customers, purchasing, warehouse, maintenance, general ledger, accounts payable, accounts receivable, human resources, utilities, DBA, as well as full shipping and selling channel integration, including Amazon.com, eBay, FedEx, and UPS.

Circle Commerce Manager is powered by Rocket UniVerse.

References

External links
 Circle Commerce official website

Companies based in Hartford County, Connecticut
Software companies based in Connecticut
Software companies established in 1991
Windsor, Connecticut
Accounting software
1991 establishments in Connecticut
Software companies of the United States